The 2001 South Florida Bulls football team represented the University of South Florida (USF) in the 2001 NCAA Division I-A football season, and was the fifth team fielded by the school. The Bulls were led by head coach Jim Leavitt in his fifth year, played their home games at Raymond James Stadium in Tampa, Florida and competed as a Division I-A Independent. The Bulls finished the season with a record of eight wins and three losses (8–3).

Schedule

Roster

References

South Florida
South Florida Bulls football seasons
South Florida Bulls football